Jones Orin York (August 5, 1893 – July 1970) was recruited in California by Soviet spy Stanislav Shumovskij approximately in 1935.  In 1950 York told the FBI that he had passed secrets to the KGB since the mid-1930s, including plans for a new airplane engine of his own design and documents on the newest fighter developed by Northrop Corporation.  York told the FBI that his KGB handler during 1941-42 had been Bill Weisband, who had helped him buy a camera for photographing documents.  York admitted he was in it for the money, although he received very little.

York's allegation was disturbing news, implying that the KGB had a mole in the sensitive Armed Forces Security Agency (AFSA). York's code name in Soviet intelligence and in the Venona project is "NEEDLE".

References

 Allen Weinstein and Alexander Vassiliev, The Haunted Wood: Soviet Espionage in America—the Stalin Era (New York: Random House, 1999). 
 Robert L. Benson, "The Venona Story", at the National Security Agency

1893 births
1970 deaths
American people in the Venona papers
American spies for the Soviet Union
Espionage in the United States
Place of birth missing